Antonio Travi (1613–1668) was an Italian painter of the Baroque period. He was born in Sestri, near Genoa, was generally known as Il Sordo di Sestri on account of his deafness. He was originally a color-grinder to Bernardo Strozzi, who instructed him in design, and he afterwards studied landscape painting under Gottfried Wals. His son Antonio was also a landscape painter.

References

1613 births
1668 deaths
17th-century Italian painters
Italian male painters
Painters from Genoa
Italian Baroque painters